Feels Like Home may refer to:

Albums 
 Feels like Home (Cassandra Vasik album), 1993
 Feels like Home (Linda Ronstadt album), 1995
 Feels like Home (Norah Jones album), 2004
 Feels like Home (Sheryl Crow album), 2013

Songs 
 "Feels like Home" (Bea Miller and Jessie Reyez song), 2019
 "Feels Like Home" (Sigala song), 2018
 "Feels like Home" (Randy Newman  song), 1995, performed by Bonnie Raitt, Linda Ronstadt and others
 "Feels Like Home", a song by LeAnn Rimes from the album Sittin' on Top of the World
 "Feels Like Home", a song by Newton Faulkner from the album Hand Built by Robots
 "Feels Like Home", a song by Meck
 "Feels Like Home", a song by Backstreet Boys from the album In a World Like This

Other 
Feels Like Home (web series), 2022 comedy-drama web series